Patharkandi is a township located in Karimganj district in the Indian state of Assam. It is 350 kilometres south of the state capital Guwahati and 32 kilometres south of the district headquarters Karimganj.

Politics
Patharkandi is part of the Patharkandi Assembly constituency and the Karimganj Lok Sabha constituency.

See also
 Patharkandi railway station
 Patharkandi (Assembly constituency)

References

Cities and towns in Karimganj district
Karimganj